Route X10 is a bus route that operates in the West Midlands between Birmingham city centre and Gornal Wood. It is operated by National Express West Midlands.

History 
The route was introduced in 2016 as a replacement for route 141. It operated between the same terminii, Birmingham and Merry Hill Shopping Centre, but runs as an express service with a frequency of one bus every 20 minutes. National Express stated that this was in response to customer feedback. In 2018, one bus per hour was extended to Gornal Wood. The extended service was funded by Transport for West Midlands. In November 2022, it was announced that the extension to Gornal Wood could be withdrawn. In late December 2022 it was confirmed that the X10  will continue to serve Gornal Wood but to a revised timetable.

Vehicles 
The route is normally operated using X10 branded double-decker buses.

References 

X10
National Express West Midlands bus routes